Survivor Tamil is an Indian reality game show the popular international Survivor format. The show is hosted by actor Arjun Sarja. The Contestants are referred to as "castaways", and they compete against one another to become the "Sole Survivor" and win ₹1 crore (₹1,00,00,000) cash prize after surviving 90 days avoiding elimination.

The series was first aired on the Zee Tamil,ZEE5 in 2021. There are 18 contestants who were participating in Survivor Tamil with two wildcard contestants.

Contestants
All information is accurate as of the time the season was filmed, and thus may vary from season to season for returning players.

References

Survivor (franchise) contestants
Lists of reality show participants